Ray Jackson (born November 13, 1973) is an American former professional basketball player. He is most well known for his time as a member of the Fab Five with the Michigan Wolverines.

College career
Jackson was part of the famed University of Michigan Wolverines Fab Five along with former NBA players Chris Webber, Jimmy King, Jalen Rose, and Juwan Howard that reached the 1992 & 1993 NCAA Men's Division I Basketball Championship games as both Freshmen and Sophomores.

Although the Fab Five final four appearances have been forfeited, he was not among the players called before the grand jury (Robert Traylor, Webber, Rose, Maurice Taylor and Louis Bullock) in the University of Michigan basketball scandal and was not found to have received large amounts of money.

Jackson and King were the only two members of the Fab Five to stay at Michigan for their full four years of eligibility; Webber left after his sophomore year and Rose and Howard after their junior years. Jackson's best season at Michigan came in his senior year,  as he averaged a team-high of nearly 16 points per game.

Professional career
Known for his time as one member of the Fab Five, Jackson was never drafted into nor played in the NBA. He was cut in preseason by the New York Knicks before the 1995–96 season and cut by the Detroit Pistons before the 1996–97 season. He was drafted in the Continental Basketball Association (CBA) by the Grand Rapids Hoops #35 in the 3rd round in 1995.

While with the Hoops, he won the 1995–96 CBA Rookie of the Year Award.

He then played in France with Pro A team SIG Basket, in Argentina in the Liga Nacional de Básquet with Obras Sanitarias (where he averaged 16 points per game) and Venezuela with Cocodrilos de Caracas.

In a February 10, 2007 article on Yahoo Sports, Jackson says that: "It took me a long time to get over the fact that I was the only one that didn't make it to the NBA from the Fab Five, but I'm over it because I'm back home and I'm happy with what I'm doing with my life."

Post-basketball career
Jackson lives in Austin, Texas, where he runs a moving company and Rise Up, a not-for-profit organization that assists children socially, educationally and on the basketball court.

References

External links
Rise Up Inc. Academic Athletic Program
University of Michigan Basketball Statistical Archive
Continental Basketball Association stats at Statscrew.com
French league stats
Argentine league stats at Worldhoopstats.com
Profile at Latinbasket.com

1973 births
Living people
African-American basketball players
Basketball players from Texas
Cocodrilos de Caracas players
Grand Rapids Hoops players
Grand Rapids Mackers players
Michigan Wolverines men's basketball players
Obras Sanitarias basketball players
Shooting guards
SIG Basket players
Small forwards
American men's basketball players
21st-century African-American sportspeople
20th-century African-American sportspeople